The 21st Continental Regiment, also known as Ward's Regiment, was raised April 23, 1775, as a Massachusetts militia regiment at Cambridge, Massachusetts, under Colonel Jonathan Ward. The regiment would join the Continental Army in June 1775. The regiment saw action during the Siege of Boston, the New York Campaign and the Battle of Trenton. The regiment was disbanded on January 1, 1777, at Morristown, New Jersey.

References

External links
Bibliography of the Continental Army in Massachusetts compiled by the United States Army Center of Military History

21st Continental Regiment